John Trengove (fl. 1547) was an English politician.

He was a Member (MP) of the Parliament of England for Helston in 1547.

References

Year of birth missing
Year of death missing
People from East Grinstead
Members of the pre-1707 English Parliament for constituencies in Cornwall
English MPs 1547–1552